The giant Gippsland earthworm, Megascolides australis, is one of Australia's 1,000 native earthworm species.

Description
They have a dark purple head and a blue-grey body, and about 300 to 400 body segments.

Ecology
They live in the subsoil of blue, grey or red clay soils along stream banks and some south- or west-facing hills of their remaining habitat which is in Gippsland in Victoria, Australia. These worms live in deep burrow systems and require water in their environment to respire. They have relatively long life spans for invertebrates and can take 5 years to reach maturity.

They are usually very sluggish, but when they move rapidly through their burrows, it can cause an audible gurgling or sucking sound which allows them to be detected.

Threatened status
Gippsland earthworm colonies are small and isolated, and the species' low reproductive rates and slow maturation make those small populations vulnerable. Their natural habitats are grasslands, and while they can survive beneath pastures, cultivation, heavy cattle grazing and effluent run-off are adversarial to the species. The Gippsland earthworm requires moist loamy soil to thrive; dense tree planting negatively affects soil humidity, which in turn negatively affects the species' habitat. No successful breeding has yet been achieved in captivity.

Education
Until it closed in 2012 amid animal welfare concerns, Wildlife Wonderland Park near Bass, Victoria, was home to the Giant Earthworm Museum. Inside the worm-shaped museum, visitors could crawl through a magnified replica of a worm burrow and a simulated worm's stomach. Displays and educational material on the giant Gippsland earthworm and other natural history of Gippsland were also featured.

Tourism
Interest in the giant Gippsland earthworm has been exploited by the local tourist industry with an annual Karmai Festival in Korumburra. In the Boonwurrung language it is said to have been called karmai.

See also
 Giant Palouse earthworm - A vulnerable North American species.
 Oregon giant earthworm - A relative of the Palouse earthworm.  Specimens have been recorded at 1.3 m (4 feet) long.
 Lake Pedder earthworm - Listed as the first "extinct" worm species from its original unique Tasmanian habitat.
 Lumbricus badensis - Giant (Badish) earthworm.
 Microchaetus rappi - Giant South African earthworm.

References

External links
Giant Gippsland earthworm at the Museum Victoria website

Megascolecidae
Vulnerable fauna of Australia
Animals described in 1878
Environment of Victoria (Australia)
Endemic fauna of Australia
Taxa named by Frederick McCoy